Myrna Melgar  (born March  17, 1968) is an American politician currently serving as a member of the San Francisco Board of Supervisors for District 7 since January 8, 2021. Melgar is the first woman elected to represent District 7. Additionally, she is the first Jewish Latina to serve on the Board of Supervisors after the implementation of District elections in 2004.

Biography
Myrna Elizabeth Melgar is an American politician from San Francisco, currently representing District 7, which includes over 30 separate neighborhoods West of Twin Peak. These diverse regions include several college campuses, attractions, and other public facilities, such as SF State University, SF City Colleges’ main campus, UCSF Parnassus, and the SF Zoo.

Melgar resides in the Ingleside Terraces neighborhood with her partner, Environmental Attorney Sean H. Donahue, and three daughters.

Early life and education 
Melgar was born in El Salvador. Her family fled during the Salvadoran Civil War when she was 12 and settled in San Francisco. Later on, she attended San Francisco State University and graduated from Excelsior College, earning a bachelor's degree in Liberal Arts and a master's degree in Urban Planning from Columbia University.

Career 
Myrna formerly worked as the executive director of the Jamestown Community Center, Deputy Director of the Mission Economic Development Agency, Director of Homeownership Programs at the Mayor's Office of Housing during the Newsom Administration, and served as President of the City Planning Commission and Vice President of the Building Inspection Commission. Melgar also served as a legislative aid to Eric Mar.

San Francisco Board of Supervisors 
Melgar was elected Supervisor for District 7 on November 3, 2020, with 18,561 total votes after ranked-choice allocations, garnering 53.1% of the vote. She was sworn into office on January 8, 2021, replacing former Supervisor and President of the Board Norman Yee, who endorsed her as his successor.

Melgar chairs the Land Use and Transportation Committee of the Board and serves on the Youth, Young Adult, and Families Committee, and the Public Safety and Neighborhood Services Committee. Melgar is also a Commissioner for the County Transportation Authority, Bay Area Air Quality District, and the First Five Commission.

Environmental 
Melgar has been active on transportation issues, including the expansion of the "Free Muni for Youth" program to all youth in August 2021. Melgar is also working to reinstate pre-pandemic transit lines while prioritizing community needs to develop the best bus routes that equitably reach all neighborhoods in San Francisco.

Additionally, Melgar introduced and passed the most wide ranging ban on two stroke small gas engines in the country. Beginning July 1, 2024, the City will be prohibited from using gas-powered landscaping equipment for City function. Additionally, the legislation introduced a city-wide ban against gas-powered landscaping equipment starting January 1, 2026. In order to help the city transition together, the policy included a new “Buy-Back Program”  to assist owners in transitioning away from such equipment. Consequently, Melgar received the Climate Hero Award from the Climate Action Coalition.

Housing 
In 2022, Melgar, along with Supervisor Gordon Mar,  co-sponsored a hearing on the San Francisco Housing Element to avoid relinquishing control of planning and housing development to the State of California. Melgar was also instrumental in the passage of the fourplex legislation that passed the full board in October 2022. In 2021, Melgar was among the members of the Board of Supervisors who voted to block construction of a 495-unit apartment building (with 25% affordable housing) on the site of a valet parking lot. The controversial vote prompted an investigation of the San Francisco Board of Supervisors by California state officials.

Policing & Public Safety 
In 2022, Melgar championed efforts to increase public safety in her district by advocating for additional funding for the ambassador program. Working with Mayor London Breed, Melgar successfully secured funding for additional community ambassadors in the West Portal, Inner Sunset, and Ocean Avenue neighborhoods.

Women's Rights 
In 2021, Melgar spoke out against the dominance of male colleagues at the Board of Supervisors,  publishing a report on the discrepancy between interruptions as well as length of comment for male and female members of the Board of Supervisors. Later that year, Melgar co-sponsored legislation to require sick leave for nannies, cleaners, and gardeners. She has also supported the ordinance that will amend the Police code to provide domestic workers’ with access to a portable Paid Sick Leave (PSL) system, which would also require hiring bodies that do not offer PSL to grant PSL payment to those with the portable system.  Additionally, in 2022, Melgar introduced legislation to include pregnancy status in nondiscrimination requirements for housing.

Recently, Melgar initiated the landmark designation of the Mothers Building at the Zoo. The building was dedicated to serve as a resting place for mothers and young children. It is also the only structure in the West that prioritized the needs of mothers, offering resources such as water, milk, and medical advice for guests. For this, Melgar accepted the Historic Preservation Award for the San Francisco Heritage in 2022.

Families & Youth 
Melgar continues to be an advocate for San Francisco's youth and families, supporting several pieces of legislation that provide financial aid or developing programs, services, and planning strategies to strengthen the City’s services for children, youth, and families. Some of Melgar’s efforts can be noted through her support of the Charter Amendment to establish a Student Access Fund.

Melgar has also moved to pass the ordinance establishing the Department of Early Childhood (EC) and an Early Childhood Community Oversight and Advisory Committee (EC COAC). This policy works to provide early care and education for children ages zero to five in San Francisco and other City departments involved in early care or education initiatives. Additionally, it institutes a transparent collaboration between the Children and Families Commission (the “First Five Commission”), and the EC COAC to provide input and recommendations to the Department regarding comprehensive strategies, procedures, and policies for the Department.

References

External links
 

21st-century American politicians
21st-century American women politicians
American politicians of Salvadoran descent
California Democrats
Living people
San Francisco Board of Supervisors members
Salvadoran emigrants to the United States
Hispanic and Latino American people in California politics
1968 births